The 2003 All-Ireland Senior Club Camogie Championship for the leading clubs in the women's team field sport of camogie was won by Granagh-Ballingarry (Limerick), who defeated Davitts (Gal) in the final, played at Mullingar.

Arrangements
The championship was organised on the traditional provincial system used in Gaelic Games since the 1880s, with Freshford and Dunloy winning the championships of the other two provinces. Lourda Kavanagh scored 11 points for Granagh to beat Dunloy in the semi-final.

The Final
Lourda Kavanagh scored 1–3 for Granagh-Ballingarry as they defeated Davitts by four points in the final.

Final stages

References

External links
 Camogie Association

2003 in camogie
2003